Benny Di Massa (born 25 April 1963) is an English musician and producer. He has played drums/guitar  for several bands in his early career including Cocteau Twins.

Benny D is the CEO and Producer/Songwriter at Powerstudio, which is based at 12 Cock Lane in Central London. He has worked with a host of top names at his London recording studio including Stormzy, Boy George, Kylie, Plan B, Robbie Williams, Paloma Faith.

Between 2019 and current  Benny D has been writing and producing Boy George Cool Karaoke Volume 1 solo and Culture Club new album. 
Benny D, with Boy George also wrote and produced music for Lee Cooper ads which features  Boy George (We Know What We Want).

In 2010 Benny D composed music for the film Baby which won a British Independent Film Award nomination.

Benny D founded the London Artist Development programme which aims to take emerging artists to the next level.  Artists to have participated in the scheme include The Puppini Sisters, Frankie Cocozza, Kye Sones and Max Milner.

In 2013, Benny D accepted an invitation to be on the judging panel for the Isle of Wight Festival Unsigned Competition from promoter, John Giddings.

References 

1963 births
English rock drummers
Living people